Alonzo Dwight Wallace  (born March 25, 1974) is a former American football defensive end in the National Football League for the Jacksonville Jaguars, Philadelphia Eagles, Carolina Panthers and Buffalo Bills. He played college football at the University of Maryland.

Early years
Wallace attended Spanish River Community High School in Boca Raton, Florida. As a junior, he played running back and rushed for over 500 yards. 

As a senior, he was a two-way player at outside linebacker and wide receiver, while tallying 31 receptions for 571 yards and 5 touchdowns. He also practiced basketball.

College career
Wallace accepted a football scholarship from the University of Maryland to play wide receiver in a run and shoot offense. He instead was moved to linebacker under head coach Mark Duffner. 

As a redshirt freshman in 1993, he was a backup, playing in 9 games and making 18 tackles (10 solo). As a sophomore, he became a starter, registering 39 tackles (27 solo), 3 sacks (led the team) and 8 tackles for loss (led the team). 

As a junior, he started 10 out of 11 games at outside linebacker, recording 47 tackles (38 solo) and 5 sacks. He also lined up at tight end in several games.

As a senior, he started 9 games, while making 40 tackles (33 solo) and being named to the AD's Honor Roll for the fifth consecutive semester. He finished his college career with 108 tackles and 12 sacks.

Professional career
Wallace was signed by the Jacksonville Jaguars as an undrafted free agent after the 1997 NFL Draft on April 21. He was tried at outside linebacker during training camp. He was waived on August 19 and later signed to the practice squad. He spent the first 13 regular season games on the team's practice squad before being released in November.

On December 2, 1997, he was signed as a free agent by the Philadelphia Eagles. On September 5, 1999, he was placed on the injured reserve list with a fractured and dislocated ankle. He was released on August 28, 2000.

In 2001, he signed as a free agent with the Chicago Bears. He was waived injured on August 28.

In March 2002, he signed as a free agent with the Miami Dolphins, after spending a year out of football. On July 19, he was traded along with a 4th round draft choice (#119-Colin Branch) to the Carolina Panthers in exchange for defensive end Jay Williams. 

In 2002, he was a backup defensive end behind Julius Peppers and Mike Rucker. In 2003, he had 38 tackles, 5 sacks, 9 quarterback hurries, 5 passes defensed and 2 interceptions, while playing in Super Bowl XXXVIII. He also played a key role on a special teams unit that blocked 5 kicks in the first 2 games of the season. 

Wallace, along with fellow Maryland alumni Kris Jenkins, Peppers, Rucker and Brentson Buckner established a formidable defensive line rotation from 2002 to 2006, which many experts considered to be among the best during that time span. 

In 2006, he registered 30 tackles, 3 sacks and 13 quarterback hurries. On February 19, 2007, he was released because of salary cap reasons. He appeared for the Panthers in 80 regular season games and 7 postseason contests, while never missing a game.

On August 22, 2007, he was signed as a free agent by the Buffalo Bills, for depth purposes behind Aaron Schobel and Chris Kelsay. On September 1, he was placed on the injured reserve list. He wasn't re-signed after the season. During his career he played in 96 games, posting 187 tackles (126 solo), 23 sacks and 4 interceptions.

References

1974 births
Living people
Sportspeople from Delray Beach, Florida
Players of American football from Florida
American football defensive ends
Maryland Terrapins football players
Jacksonville Jaguars players
Philadelphia Eagles players
Carolina Panthers players
Buffalo Bills players